Rosa Rush  (1905 – 1971) was an American artist known for her work with the Federal Art Project of the Works Progress Administration (WPA). Her work is included in the collections of the Metropolitan Museum of Art, the National Gallery of Art, and the Smithsonian American Art Museum.

Gallery

References

External links

1905 births
1971 deaths
20th-century American printmakers
20th-century American women artists
American women printmakers
Federal Art Project artists